The 1936 Milan–San Remo was the 29th edition of the Milan–San Remo cycle race and was held on 19 March 1936. The race started in Milan and finished in San Remo. The race was won by Angelo Varetto.

General classification

References

1936
1936 in road cycling
1936 in Italian sport
March 1936 sports events